The 1944 Texas gubernatorial election was held on November 7, 1944.

Incumbent Democratic Governor Coke R. Stevenson defeated Republican nominee B. J. Peasley with 90.95% of the vote.

Nominations

Democratic primary
The Democratic primary election was held on July 22, 1944. By winning over 50% of the vote, Stevenson avoided a run-off which would have been held on August 26, 1944.

Candidates

Edward L. Carey, real estate agent
Minnie Fisher Cunningham, farmer, political activist, unsuccessful candidate for Democratic nomination for U.S. Senator in 1928
Alex M. Ferguson, businessman and unsuccessful candidate for Democratic nomination for Governor in 1942
William F. Grimes, attorney
Martin Jones, farmer
Herbert E. Mills, dentist
W. J. Minton, newspaper editor
Gene S. Porter, businessman and unsuccessful candidate for Democratic nomination for Governor in 1942
Coke R. Stevenson, incumbent Governor

Results

Republican nomination

The Republicans nominated B. J. Peasley, railroadman, at their state convention at Dallas on August 8, 1944.

General election

Candidates
Coke R. Stevenson, Democratic
B. J. Peasley, Republican

Results

References

Bibliography
 
 

1944
Texas
Gubernatorial
November 1944 events